Ludwig Kurt Merckle (born 1965) is a German businessman. He is CEO of Merckle Service GmbH. As of October 2021, his net worth is estimated at US$6.3 billion.

Early life 
His father was Adolf Merckle, founder of the Merckle group. Ludwig Kurt Merckle earned a degree in business information technology (Diplom-Wirtschaftsinformatiker) from the University of Mannheim.

Career 
Merckle started his career as a strategic consultant at Roland Berger in 1993. In 1995, he joined his family's business as an assistant manager. In 1997, he was promoted to CEO of Merckle GmbH, parent company of Ratiopharm GmbH. In 2005, he was appointed CEO of VEM Vermögensverwaltung GmbH, and in 2009, CEO of Merckle Service GmbH, after his father committed suicide and left the family group in debt.

In March 2010, the generic drugmaking arm of Merckle, Ratiopharm, was sold to Teva Pharmaceutical Industries for €3.6 billion, 55% of HeidelbergCement for €2.5 billion, and other assets to clear their debts.

Wealth 
According to Forbes, Merckle had a net worth of $6.3 billion, as of October 2021.

Personal life 
Merckle is married to Ursula; they have two children and live in Ulm.

References 

Businesspeople from Bavaria
German billionaires
People from Ulm
1965 births
Living people
German businesspeople in the healthcare industry
20th-century German businesspeople
21st-century German businesspeople